Adform is a global digital media advertising technology company specializing in real-time programmatic marketing automation technologies. Its operations are headquartered in Europe. The company specialized in the creation of technology that helps digital advertisers, agencies, and publishers create, target, buy or sell, and display digital advertising across internet-connected device. The company claims to provide technologies for each stage of the digital advertising process.

Product lines

 When Adform launched in 2003 they were focused on providing ad serving which was supplemented by planning in 2005.  
 In 2019 Adform re-branded its Advertiser Edge and Publisher Edge offerings as the Integrated Advertising Platform and the Integrated Advertising Platform for Publishers. 
 In 2020 Adform launched an update to its user experience and underlying technology called Adform FLOW which was the winner of the Red Dot Design ward for the Communication Design Category and a 2022 iF Design Award.

The combination of DSP and DMP as a strong performer in both Forrester Wave reports made Adform one of only four advertising technology companies recognized in both reports. 2017 also saw the company become one of the first advertising technology companies and the first dedicated DSP, to secure Media Ratings Council accreditation for viewability measurement across Desktop, Mobile Web and App environments for both Display and Video ads. In 2018, 2019, 2020, and 2021 Adform was featured as a Leader in Gartner's Magical Quadrant for Ad Tech.

Markets
Adform has offices in 28 countries.

Company Affairs
The company was the first pan-European DSP. A Series B round of funding for US$5.5 million was closed in early 2014 followed by a 150 million Danish Kroner (US$21.5 million) investment by Danica Pension in late 2015. In 2018 an IPO was announced, but later postponed due to uncertainty and volatility in the financial markets at that time. In April 2019, Adform received an external investment from GRO Capital for an undisclosed amount. In April 2020, Troels Philip Jensen replaced Gustav Mellentin as CEO of Adform.

References

Software companies of Denmark
Software companies based in Copenhagen
Danish companies established in 2002
Companies based in Copenhagen Municipality